Syed Amir Ali Shah Jamote (born 18 January 1941) is a Pakistani politician who had been a member of the National Assembly of Pakistan, from 2002 to May 2018.

Early life
He was born on 18 January 1941.

Political career

He was elected to the National Assembly of Pakistan as a candidate of Pakistan Peoples Party (PPP) from Constituency NA-221 (Hyderabad-IV) in 2002 Pakistani general election. He received 44,899 votes and defeated Syed Shahabuddin Shah, a candidate of Pakistan Muslim League (Q) (PML-Q).

He was re-elected to the National Assembly as a candidate of PPP from Constituency NA-221 (Hyderabad-cum-Matiari) in 2008 Pakistani general election. He received 102,737 votes and defeated Hussaini Shahabuddin Shah, a candidate of PML-Q.

He was re-elected to the National Assembly as a candidate of PPP from Constituency NA-221 (Hyderabad-cum-Matiari) in 2013 Pakistani general election. He received 59,821 votes and defeated Rajab Ali, a candidate of Sindh Taraqi Pasand Party.

References

Living people
Pakistan People's Party politicians
Sindhi people
Pakistani MNAs 2013–2018
People from Sindh
1941 births
Pakistani MNAs 2008–2013
Pakistani MNAs 2002–2007